Rockridge or Rock Ridge may refer to:

Places

United States
by state
Rockridge, Oakland, California
Rockridge (BART station), transit station
Rock Ridge, Connecticut, a section of the town of Greenwich
Rockridge, Georgia
Rock Ridge (Monterey, Massachusetts), listed on the National Register of Historic Places
Rock Ridge (New Jersey), a lake
Rockridge, West Virginia
Rockridge Press

Canada
Rock Ridge, Manitoba, a community

Schools
Rockridge Secondary School, West Vancouver, British Columbia, Canada
Rockridge High School, Illinois, United States

Other
Rock Ridge, a CD-ROM filesystem extension
Rock Ridge Music, an independent music label
The Rockridge Institute, a now-defunct progressive think tank formerly located in Berkeley, California
Rock Ridge, a fictional town in the comedy film Blazing Saddles
Rock Ridge (Monterey, Massachusetts), a house on the National Register of Historic Places